The 2013 Minneapolis City Council elections were held on November 5, 2013 to elect the 13 members of the Minneapolis City Council for four-year terms. 10 races produced a winner in the first round and the remaining three in the second round. Candidates affiliated with the Minnesota Democratic–Farmer–Labor Party (DFL) won all 12 of the seats where they had fielded a candidate, and the Green Party of Minnesota won the remaining one seat.

Members were elected from single-member districts via instant-runoff voting, popularly known as ranked choice voting. Voters had the option of ranking up to three candidates. Municipal elections in Minnesota are officially nonpartisan, although candidates were able to identify with a political party on the ballot.

Candidates
Names of incumbents are italicized.

Dropped out

Griggs announced on October 20, 2013 that he had accepted a job offer and would no longer be running.

Results

Summary

Ward 1

Ward 2

Ward 3

Ward 4

Ward 5

Ward 6

Ward 7

Ward 8

Ward 9

Ward 10

Ward 11

Ward 12

Ward 13

See also
 Minneapolis municipal elections, 2013
 Minneapolis mayoral election, 2013

Notes

References

External links
 Minneapolis Elections & Voter Services
 Elections & Voting - Minnesota Secretary of State

News media coverage
 2013 Minneapolis elections from the Star Tribune
 Election News from The Journal
 Election News from the Southwest Journal
 2013 Elections from My Broadsheet

Minneapolis City Council
Minneapolis City Council 2013
Minneapolis City Council 2013
Minneapolis City Council